The Kingston Academy (TKA), is a co-educational secondary free school located in the London Borough of Kingston upon Thames, south-west London, established in September 2015.

TKA underwent refurbishment and expansion which was completed in September 2019.

TKA's facilities include:

 a full-sized, fully-equipped sports hall and dance studio
 a lecture theatre
 a dining atrium
 a library
 modern science laboratories

TKA is governed by the Kingston Educational Trust, a  partnership between Kingston University, Kingston College and the Royal Borough of Kingston.

References

Secondary schools in the Royal Borough of Kingston upon Thames
Free schools in London
Free Schools with a Local Authority Sponsor
Academies in the Royal Borough of Kingston upon Thames